The first Oxford Dance Symposium at New College, Oxford took place on 21 April 1999 with Dance on the English Stage, and has become an annual, international event which attracts scholars and practitioners from many parts of the world. Each symposium is designed to explore different aspects of dance, with particular reference to its musical, theatrical, literary and social context in Britain and Europe during the long 18th century; and as such has embraced subjects ranging from the 17th-century Stuart Masque and French ballet de cour to early 19th-century opera and ballet. There is a particular emphasis on new research or new appraisals of existing sources, and although the symposium issues no Proceedings, some of the papers from several symposia have been published as books of essays or as individual papers in academic journals. The symposium is organised each year by Michael Burden and Jennifer Thorp.

Symposia 
 Dance, Costume and Scenography, April 2023 Forthcoming
 Dancing in Town and Country, April 2022
 Watching Dance, Dancers, and Audiences, April 2021 
 COVID-19
 Reading Dance, April 2019
 Dance and Drama, April 2018
 Dance and the City, April 2017
 Teaching Dance, April 2016
 Dancing for Anniversaries and Occasions: Chamber, Court, Theatre & Assembly, April 2015
 The dancer in celebrity culture in the long 18th-century: reputations, images, portraits, April 2014
 Living, dancing, travelling, dying: dancers’ lives in the long 18th century, April 2013
 Dancing in the theatre of Europe in the long 18th century, April 2012
 Dance and the novel, May 2011
 Jean-Georges Noverre and his circle, April 2010
 Dance and Image, May 2009
 Dancing in Royal Palaces, May 2008
 French and English Pantomime, May 2007
 Dancers Abroad, May 2006
 'Counting sheep'; Dance and the Pastoral, April 2005
 Royal Ballet de la Nuit, April 2004 see Ballet Royal de la Nuit.
 Roi Soleil and Soleil Dieu, March 2003
 Dancing Exploded, October, 2002
 Gods, Men and Monsters, April 2001
 'So Publick an Approbation': attitudes to dance in 18th-Century England, April 2000
 Dance on the English Stage, April 1999

Publications 
The symposium does not publish proceedings, but publications relating to the sessions have subsequently appeared.

 Michael Burden and Jennifer Thorp, eds, With a Grace Not to be Captured; Representing the Georgian Theatrical Dancer, 1760-1830 (Turnhout, Belgium: Brepols, 2020). The book was joint winner of the 2021 Claire Brook Award for an outstanding volume on music iconography published in 2020. The award is made by the Barry S. Brook Center for Music Research and Documentation at CUNY.
 Michael Burden and Jennifer Thorp, eds, The works of Monsieur Noverre translated from the French: Noverre, his circle, and the English Lettres sur la danse (Hillsdale, New York: Pendragon Press, 2014).
 Michael Burden and Jennifer Thorp, guest eds, Music in Art: International Journal for Music Iconography: Special Issue Dance and Image, 36/1-2 (2011).
 Michael Burden and Jennifer Thorp, guest eds, The Court Historian: Special Issue Dancing in Royal Palaces, 15/2 (2010).
 Michael Burden and Jennifer Thorp, eds, The Ballet de la Nuit: ROTHSCHILD B1/16/6 (Hillsdale, New York: Pendragon Press, 2009).
 Michael Burden and Jennifer Thorp, guest eds, Early Music: Dance in Restoration England, 26/4 (2007).

External links 
 Official website

References 

Performing arts education in the United Kingdom
New College, Oxford